Indian Navy Football Club serves as a football section of Indian Navy. The team regularly participates in the Durand Cup and also as guests on various regional tournaments. The club consists of Indian Navy officials.

Honours

League
Mumbai Football League
 Champions (2): 1954, 1957
Kerala Premier League
 Champions (1): 2018–19

Cup
 IFA Shield
 Runners-up (1): 1960
 Nadkarni Cup
 Champions (1): 1957
 Runners-up (1): 1962
 Services Cup
 Champions (1): 2013

See also
 Indian Navy
 Army Red

 Army Green
 Indian Air Force
 Services football team
 Indian Army Service Corps

References

Navy
Organizations with year of establishment missing
Indian Navy